Peter Vallentyne (born March 25, 1952, in New Haven, Connecticut) is Florence G. Kline Professor of Philosophy at the University of Missouri in Columbia, Missouri.  He holds dual citizenship in the United States and Canada.

Biography
Vallentyne received his B.A. from McGill University in 1978 and his Ph.D. from the University of Pittsburgh in 1984, under the direction of David Gauthier and with significant help from Shelly Kagan. He formerly taught at the University of Western Ontario (1984–88) and Virginia Commonwealth University (1988-2003).

Vallentyne has written on a variety of topics in ethical theory and political philosophy, including consequentialism, contractarianism, moral dilemmas, responsibility, equality, self-ownership, liberty, and justice. He defends a version of equal opportunity for wellbeing left-libertarianism.

Selected bibliography

References
 CV

1952 births
Living people
20th-century American philosophers
21st-century American philosophers
American libertarians
Libertarian socialists
University of Missouri faculty
Left-libertarians